The Toyota QuickDelivery is a step van that shares a platform with the Dyna, the ToyoAce, and the HiAce. The QuickDelivery was introduced in 1982, and allows passengers to walk from the drivers seat to the rear of the vehicle standing upright. The powertrain comes as a rear wheel drive or four wheel drive. It is capable of a 2-ton payload starting with the second generation produced from 1986 to 1999. Later a revised version appeared badged the Urban Supporter. It was requested by Yamato Transport, who said, "I want a car with a high ceiling that does not require me to bend down even when working in the car."

First Generation (100) 

The 100 model series began in the second quarter of 1982. The truck allowed a maximum load of 1.25 tons. The First Generation Quick Delivery was only available with permanent all-wheel drive. The vehicle was powered by a 3-liter Hino engine.

Second Generation (200) 

The Quick Delivery 200 was released in January 1986. With the new version, a total load of up to two tons could now be transported. A Toyota 3B engine with a displacement of 3.0 liters and a Toyota B engine with a displacement of 3.4 liters were available. Due to new emission regulations in 1994, the engines had to be adapted accordingly. At the same time, the interior was also revised and refreshed with new style elements. For the first time in 1999, the name has now been abbreviated as QD. For the QD200, Toyota uses a 4B engine (diesel engine) with a displacement of 3.7 liters. The QD200 is currently classified as a low-emission vehicle by the Japanese ministries, giving customers tax breaks. Appropriate approval was given by the Ministry of Land and Economy, which awarded the QD200 the environmental prize. In 2000 Toyota added an LPG variant with a 2.7 liter 3RZ engine to an engine range. However, the diesel has so far remained the more popular version with customers.

Third generation 

The new Quick Delivery was shown in January 2001, under the name Urban Supporter. The Y200 was designed for a maximum payload of 1.25 tons. Toyota used its own 5L engine for the drive.

References

QuickDelivery
Vans